Infernophilus castaneus is a species of beetle in the family Carabidae, the only species in the genus Infernophilus.

References

Lebiinae